Ander Barrenetxea Uriarte (born 29 March 1992 in Galdakao) is a Spanish cyclist, who most recently rode for UCI Professional Continental team .

References

External links

1992 births
Living people
Spanish male cyclists
Cyclists from the Basque Country (autonomous community)
People from Galdakao
Sportspeople from Biscay